This article is about the foreign relations of Tuvalu. From 1916 to 1975, Tuvalu was part of the Gilbert and Ellice Islands colony of the United Kingdom. A referendum was held in 1974 to determine whether the Gilbert Islands and Ellice Islands should each have their own administration. As a consequence of the referendum, the separate British colonies of Kiribati and Tuvalu were formed. Tuvalu became fully independent as a sovereign state within the Commonwealth on 1 October 1978. On 5 September 2000, Tuvalu became the 189th member of the United Nations.

In terms of physical land size, Tuvalu is the fourth smallest country in the world, larger only than the Vatican City—0.44 km2; Monaco—1.95 km2 and Nauru—21 km2. it is the third-least populated independent country in the world, with a population of 10,507 (2017 Census). Because of the small size of the economy of Tuvalu, its foreign relations are limited to its most important partners. Tuvalu maintains close relations with Fiji, New Zealand, Australia (which has maintained a High Commission in Tuvalu since 2018), Japan, South Korea, Taiwan, the United States of America, the United Kingdom and the European Union. It has diplomatic relations with Taiwan.

As a small Pacific Island nation, a major concern is the effect of climate change on the atolls. Tuvalu is a developing country and works with other island states, which tend to share similar sustainable development challenges, such as the Pacific Small Island Developing States (PSIDS).

Tuvalu participates in the work of the Pacific Community (SPC) and is a member of the Pacific Islands Forum, the Commonwealth of Nations and the United Nations. It has maintained a mission at the United Nations in New York City since 2000.

International organisational participation

Tuvalu and the Commonwealth of Nations

On 1 September 2000, Tuvalu became a full member of the Commonwealth of Nations. Since its independence in 1978, Tuvalu had been a special member, but without having any voting rights in the organisation that brings together 54 countries that are mostly former colonies of the United Kingdom. Tuvalu's admission as a full member was approved by the members of the Commonwealth unanimously earlier in the year.

Membership of the United Nations

Tuvalu became the 189th member of the United Nations on 17 September 2000. Ambassador Samuelu Laloniu was the permanent representative of Tuvalu to the United Nations. He took up his post on 21 July 2017. He also presented his credentials as Tuvalu's ambassador to the United States on 21 July 2017. He vacated these offices on 19 January 2023.

Tuvalu notably played an active role in the 2009 United Nations Climate Change Conference in Copenhagen, attracting media and public attention with a proposed protocol which would have imposed deeper, legally binding emission cuts, including on developing nations. Following Tuvaluan delegate Ian Fry's "tear-jerking [speech] that prompted wild applause among the crowded Copenhagen conference floor", The Australians political editor commented that Tuvalu was "no longer small fry on the world stage".

The United Nations designates Tuvalu as a least developed country (LDC) because of its limited potential for economic development, absence of exploitable resources and its small size and vulnerability to external economic and environmental shocks. Tuvalu participates in the Enhanced Integrated Framework for Trade-Related Technical Assistance to Least Developed Countries (EIF), which was established in October 1997 under the auspices of the World Trade Organisation. In 2013 Tuvalu deferred its graduation from least developed country (LDC) status to a Developing country to 2015. Prime Minister Enele Sopoaga said that this deferral was necessary to maintain access by Tuvalu to the funds provided by the United Nations's National Adaptation Programme of Action (NAPA), as  "Once Tuvalu graduates to a developed country, it will not be considered for funding assistance for climate change adaptation programmes like NAPA, which only goes to LDCs". Tuvalu had met targets so that Tuvalu was to graduate from LDC status. Prime minister, Enele Sopoaga wants the United Nations to reconsider its criteria for graduation from LDC status as not enough weight is given to the environmental plight of small island states like Tuvalu in the application of the Environmental Vulnerability Index (EVI).

Regional organisational relations

Tuvalu is a full member of the Pacific Islands Forum, the South Pacific Applied Geoscience Commission, the South Pacific Tourism Organisation, the Secretariat of the Pacific Regional Environment Programme and the Pacific Community.

Tuvalu participates in the operations of the Pacific Island Forum Fisheries Agency (FFA) and the Western and Central Pacific Fisheries Commission (WCPFC). The Tuvaluan government, the US government, and the governments of other Pacific islands, are parties to the South Pacific Tuna Treaty (SPTT), entered into force in 1988. The current SPTT agreement expires on 14 June 2013. Tuvalu is one of the eight signatories of the Nauru Agreement Concerning Cooperation in the Management of Fisheries of Common Interest (Nauru Agreement) which collectively controls 25–30% of the world's tuna supply and approximately 60% of the western and central Pacific tuna supply . In May 2013 representatives from the United States and the Pacific Islands countries agreed to sign interim arrangement documents to extend the Multilateral Fisheries Treaty (which encompasses the South Pacific Tuna Treaty and Nauru Agreement) to confirm access to the fisheries in the Western and Central Pacific for US tuna boats for 18 months.

In 1993, Tuvalu became a member of the Asian Development Bank. Tuvalu endorsed the Treaty of Rarotonga joining itself to the South Pacific Nuclear Free Zone Treaty in 1985.

In 2004, Tuvalu provided police officers to the Regional Assistance Mission to Solomon Islands (RAMSI). Tuvaluan Police officers served as part of RAMSI's Participating Police Force (PPF).

In November 2011, Tuvalu was one of the eight founding members of Polynesian Leaders Group, a regional grouping intended to cooperate on a variety of issues including culture and language, education, responses to climate change, and trade and investment."New Polynesian Leaders Group formed in Samoa", Radio New Zealand International, 18 November 2011 Tuvalu participates in the Alliance of Small Island States (AOSIS), which is a coalition of small island and low-lying coastal countries that have concerns about their vulnerability to the adverse effects of global climate change. Under the Majuro Declaration, which was signed on 5 September 2013, Tuvalu committed to implement power generation of 100% renewable energy, which was proposed to be implemented using Solar PV (95% of demand) and biodiesel (5% of demand). The feasibility of wind power generation will be considered as part of the commitment to increase the use of renewable energy in Tuvalu.

On 18 February 2016 Tuvalu signed the Pacific Islands Development Forum Charter and formally joined the Pacific Islands Development Forum (PIDF). In June 2017, Tuvalu signed the Pacific Agreement on Closer Economic Relations (PACER).

International organisations

In addition to its membership in the UN and the Commonwealth of Nations, outside the region, Tuvalu is a member or participant of the ACP (Lomé Convention), the Alliance of Small Island States, Asian Development Bank, Economic and Social Commission for Asia and the Pacific (ESCAP), the Food and Agriculture Organization (FAO), the G-77, the International Bank for Reconstruction and Development, the International Civil Aviation Organization, the International Development Association, the International Finance Corporation, the IMF, the International Maritime Organization, the International Olympic Committee, the ITU and the Universal Postal Union. While Tuvalu is not currently a member of the International Red Cross and Red Crescent Movement, it has observer status with admission and recognition still pending.

In July 2013 Tuvalu signed the Memorandum of Understanding (MOU) to establish the Pacific Regional Trade and Development Facility, which Facility originated in 2006, in the context of negotiations for an Economic Partnership Agreement (EPA) between Pacific ACP States and the European Union. The rationale for the creation of the Facility being to improve the delivery of aid to Pacific island countries in support of the Aid-for-Trade (AfT) requirements. The Pacific ACP States are the countries in the Pacific that are signatories to the Cotonou Agreement with the European Union (which succeeded the Lomé Convention). On 31 May 2017 the first enhanced High Level Political Dialogue between Tuvalu and the European Union under the Cotonou Agreement was held in Funafuti.

Tuvalu is also a member of the following organisations:

ACP, ADB, AOSIS, Commonwealth of Nations, FAO, IBRD (also known as the World Bank), ICAO, IDA, IFRCS (observer), ILO, IMF, IMO, IOC, ITU, OPCW, PIF, Sparteca, SPC, UN, UNCTAD, UNESCO, UPU, WHO, World Meteorological Organization.

Tuvalu became a member of the Asian Development Bank in 1993, and became a member of the World Bank in 2010.

Tuvalu is notable for its absence of membership in several major international organisations. For example, it is one of only four UN members that do not belong to the Specialized Agencies. Tuvalu is one of only 13 UN members that are not members of the International Finance Corporation and is one of only 16 UN members that have neither member nor observers of the World Trade Organization. Finally, as with many other nations in Oceania, Tuvalu is not a member of Interpol or of the International Hydrographic Organization.

Relations with other nations

Consulates and honorary consulates

Tuvalu's only full diplomatic missions are its permanent mission to the United Nations in New York, its embassy in Brussels, Belgium, its embassy in the Republic of China (Taiwan), its High Commission in Wellington, New Zealand and its High Commission in Suva, Fiji. Tuvalu's mission to the United Nations also doubles as its embassy to the United States. Additionally, Tuvalu maintains honorary consulates in Australia, Germany, Japan, New Zealand, the Philippines, Singapore, South Korea, Switzerland, the United States and the United Kingdom.

The Republic of China (Taiwan) has a resident embassy in Tuvalu. France maintains an honorary consulate in Tuvalu. In 2018 Australia upgraded its representation in Tuvalu from a representative office of AusAid to a High Commission. All three of these are located in Funafuti.
In 2021 Tuvalu appointed Ambassador Shivshankar Nair GCEG as its Envoy to The Commonwealth to lead the campaign of Sir Italeli Iakoba, the former Governor General to become the SG of the Commonwealth.
Subsequently, Ambassador Nair was appointed Special Envoy in charge of Oceans and Climate change
Bilateral relationsList of countries which Tuvalu maintains diplomatic relations with:'

Foreign policy issues

Support to the right of self-determination
In March 2017, at the 34th regular session of the UN Human Rights Council, Vanuatu made a joint statement on behalf of Tuvalu and some other Pacific nations raising human rights violations in the Western New Guinea, which has been occupied by Indonesia since 1963, and requested that the UN High Commissioner for Human Rights produce a report. Indonesia rejected Vanuatu's allegations. More than 100,000 Papuans have died during a 50-year Papua conflict. In September 2017, at the 72nd Session of the UN General Assembly, the Prime Ministers of Tuvalu, Vanuatu and the Solomon Islands once again raised human rights abuses in Indonesian-occupied West Papua.

Recognition of Palestine
: On 10 September 2015, the United Nations General Assembly passed a Palestinian resolution to allow its flag to fly in front of the United Nations headquarters in New York. The vote was passed with 119 votes in support, 8 opposing, and 45 abstentions. Tuvalu was one of the eight opposing votes. Palestine had previously been granted UN "non-member observer state" status in 2012.

External links 

Tuvalu at the United Nations 
 Address by His Excellency Vete Palakua Sakaio, Deputy Prime Minister of Tuvalu at the general debate of the 68th Session of the General Assembly of the United Nations (28 Sep 2013)
 The Flags of Tuvalu

See also

 List of diplomatic missions in Tuvalu
 List of diplomatic missions of Tuvalu

References

 
 
Tuvalu and the Commonwealth of Nations